Scythris durbanensis is a moth of the family Scythrididae. It was described by Bengt Å. Bengtsson in 2014. It is found in KwaZulu-Natal, South Africa.

References

Endemic moths of South Africa
durbanensis
Moths described in 2014